Billingsley Creek Wildlife Management Area at  is an Idaho wildlife management area in Gooding County near the town of Hagerman. The WMA is in the Hagerman Valley near the Snake River and was purchased from the McCarther Cattle Company in September 1963.

The area is managed for migratory waterfowl, and other wildlife includes raptors and small game animals. The WMA is open to hunting, duck hunting is the dominant late-winter use, and deer hunting is limited to shotguns only.

References

Protected areas established in 1963
Protected areas of Gooding County, Idaho
Wildlife management areas of Idaho